GTS-21 (DMXBA) is a derivative of the natural product anabaseine that acts as a partial agonist at neural nicotinic acetylcholine receptors. It binds to both the α4β2 and α7 subtypes, but activates only the α7 to any significant extent.

Both GTS-21 itself and its demethylated active metabolite 4-OH-GTS-21 display nootropic and neuroprotective effects, and GTS-21 is being investigated for the treatment of Alzheimer's disease, nicotine dependence, and, most significantly, for schizophrenia.

Phase one of a clinical trial using DXMBA as a potential treatment was completed in January of 2005. 12 non-smoking subjects each received 3 daily treatments. The treatments consisted of 150mg of DMXBA, with another dose of 75mg administered 2 hours later, 75mg of DXMBA, with another dose of 37.5mg administered 2 hours later, and a placebo treatment. The order of the doses was randomized over the 3-day course of the treatments. A P50 auditory-evoked test measured a significant effect on sensory gating, and a Repeatable Battery for Assessment of Neuropsychological Status test measured a significant effect on neurocognition. The subjects did not report any symptoms or side effects, however the leukocyte count of one subject decreased from slightly above normal on the placebo, to slightly below normal when administered the higher dose of DXMBA. After receiving no exposure to the drug, the subject's leukocyte count returned to normal 2 days later.

The laboratory name GTS-21 means that it is the 21st chemical compound created by Gainesville (University of Florida in Gainesville) and Tokushima (Taiho Pharmaceutical) Scientists. DMXBA – 3-2,4-dimethoxybenzylidene anabaseine.

References 

Antipsychotics
3-Pyridyl compounds
Nicotinic agonists
Stimulants
Phenol ethers
Tetrahydropyridines